Chambers County-Winnie Stowell Airport  is a county-owned public-use airport located in Chambers County, Texas, United States. The airport is named after the unincorporated communities of Winnie and Stowell, both located east of the airport. It is also known as Tom Jenkins Memorial Airport.

Facilities and aircraft
It has one runway designated 17/35 with a 3,600 by 75 ft (1,097 x 23 m) asphalt pavement.

For the 12-month period ending September 20, 2007, the airport had 3,000 aircraft operations, an average of 250 per month, all of which were general aviation. In August 2017, there were 13 aircraft based at this airport: 12 single-engine and 1 jet.

References

External links
 

Airports in Greater Houston
Buildings and structures in Chambers County, Texas
Transportation in Chambers County, Texas